Thomas Prince (20 February 1879 – 1950) was an English professional footballer who played as a winger for Sunderland.

References

1879 births
1950 deaths
People from Hetton-le-Hole
Footballers from Tyne and Wear
English footballers
Association football wingers
Selbourne F.C. players
Sunderland A.F.C. players
English Football League players